Trapania caerulea is a species of sea slug, a dorid nudibranch, a marine gastropod mollusc in the family Goniodorididae.

Distribution
This species was first described from Bali, Indonesia.

Description
This goniodorid nudibranch is translucent blue in colour, mostly obscured by opaque white surface pigment. The gills and rhinophores are brown. There are two thin brown lines running from behind the rhinophores to the sides of the body where they follow the mantle edge and join behind the gills.

Ecology
Trapania caerulea probably feeds on Entoprocta which often grow on sponges and other living substrata.

References

External links
 

Goniodorididae
Gastropods described in 2008